Andrew Kirkpatrick may refer to:

Andrew Kirkpatrick (politician) (1848–1928), leader of the South Australian division of the Australian Labor Party, 1917–1918
Andrew Kirkpatrick (lawyer) (1756–1831), chief justice of the New Jersey Supreme Court, 1804–1825
 Andrew Kirkpatrick (judge) (1844–1904), U.S. federal judge
Andy Kirkpatrick (born 1971), British mountaineer and author